Cimorelli is an American singing group from El Dorado Hills, California consisting of 5 sisters: Christina, Katherine, Lisa, Amy, and Lauren. They first gained popularity on YouTube singing cover music and were subsequently signed to Universal Music's Island Records and Republic Records labels in 2009. Their oldest brother, Mike Jr., was a member of the group from 2007 to 2008, while their youngest sister Dani was a member from 2010 to 2020. The group's sound is mainly family-friendly pop music with tight harmonies and occasional band instruments. Their lyrics are centered on the themes of self-worth, friendship, love, heartbreak, and their Christian faith.

Cimorelli is now an independent band and reside in Nashville, Tennessee.

 they have released nine extended plays, three full-length albums titled Up at Night, Alive, and Sad Girls Club, a mixtape called Hearts on Fire, and two Christmas compilation albums.

Early life and education
The Cimorelli sisters grew up in a Catholic and home-schooled family consisting of 13 people: their dad, mom, and 5 brothers. Their mom Lynne is a composer, classical pianist, and choir director who taught her children to harmonize, sing, and play the piano. All of the sisters have attended community college for at least 1 semester, with the exception of Amy.

Personal life

Catholicism and religion
Cimorelli is born and raised Catholic. They believe their Catholic faith is extremely important to them and it is the driving force behind everything they do. Their religious beliefs influence several aspects of their personal life, such as not using profanity in their music or in everyday life, waiting until marriage, and not using birth control.

On July 9, 2017, Lisa and singer-songwriter Lauren Jauregui got into an argument on Twitter after Jauregui criticized the Catholic Church for its historically homophobic and controversial views. Cimorelli rebutted by stating that not all Catholics have the same views.

Cimorelli supports the pro-life movement and has attended its annual marches. On January 17, 2019, Cimorelli performed at an event with the Franciscan Friars of the Renewal to raise awareness of the movement.

Health
Seven out of the eleven Cimorelli siblings, including Katherine, Amy, Lauren and Dani, were born with brachydactyly, a condition which causes their fingers to be abnormally short and crooked.

Amy was diagnosed with mosaic Turner syndrome at the age of nine.

Christina was diagnosed with a genetic blood clotting disorder after experiencing a miscarriage in her first pregnancy in 2019.

Katherine was diagnosed with an eating disorder in 2020 and is currently in recovery for it. She was also diagnosed with Pre-eclampsia during her first pregnancy with her twin boys in 2021.

Lisa was diagnosed with Gestational diabetes during her first pregnancy with her baby girl in 2021.

Members

Current members
Members are listed from oldest to youngest, along with other tasks besides vocals.

Christina Cimorelli: founder, leader, vocal arrangements, songwriter, pianist, choreographer (2007–present)
Katherine Cimorelli: bassist, songwriter (2007–present)
Lisa Cimorelli: harmony arrangements, video editor, songwriter, pianist, percussionist (2007–present)
Amy Cimorelli: guitarist, pianist, songwriter (2007–present)
Lauren Cimorelli: arrangements, songwriter, pianist (2007–present)

Former members
Michael "Mike" Cimorelli Jr: guitarist (2007–2008)
Danielle "Dani" Cimorelli: graphic designer, video editor, guitarist, songwriter, arrangements, pianist (2010–2020)

Artistry
Cimorelli is a pop vocal group that incorporates elements of piano, guitar, drums, and bass into their music. They describe their music as "real, emotional, fun, and expressive". The group is influenced by all the different types of music they listen to: indie, emo, country, soul, and Christian music. As a group, they are inspired by Demi Lovato, Alanis Morissette, Sam Hunt, and Ed Sheeran. The Jonas Brothers, Taylor Swift, JoJo, Ed Sheeran, and Sam Hunt have influenced individual members of the group musically.

Career

2007–2009: Formation and beginnings
In 2007, Mike Jr., Christina, Katherine, Lisa, Amy, and Lauren launched Cimorelli as a vocal group. The group sang at small shows around their hometown and the Sacramento area. On December 12, 2008, Cimorelli released their debut EP, Hello There (also known as Cimorelli).

After the release of Hello There, Mike Jr. left the band.

On August 10, 2009, the group (then consisting of Christina, Katherine, Lisa, Amy, and Lauren) uploaded their cover of "Party in the U.S.A.". Following this release Cimorelli began releasing weekly covers.

Cimorelli was signed by Island Records and Republic Records in 2009. The family then moved from El Dorado Hills, California to Malibu, California.

2010–2015: Island Records and Republic Records
In 2010, their youngest sister, Dani, joined the band.

On December 6, 2011, Cimorelli released their 2nd EP, CimFam. This marked their first release under a major record label. The EP included 5 of Cimorelli's most popular covers and an original song written by all of the girls called Million Bucks. The EP peaked at number 9 on the US Top Heatseekers chart.

In July 2012, Cimorelli was nominated for Choice Web Star at the 2012 Teen Choice Awards.

Later that year on December 11, 2012 the group released their 3rd EP, Believe It. The EP consisted of 3 original songs and 1 Christmas cover. The music video for the title track of the EP also premiered on Cimorelli's Vevo channel on the same day. It was directed by music video, commercial, and film director Hannah Lux Davis. The EP peaked at number 7 on the US Top Heatseekers chart.

On June 18, 2013, Cimorelli released their 4th EP, Made in America. The EP consisted of 4 original songs. The music video for the title track of the EP premiered on Cimorelli's Vevo channel a week later on June 26, 2013. It was directed by music video director Erik White. The EP peaked at number 179 on the Billboard 200 chart and at number 4 on the US Top Heatseekers chart.

At the 2013 Teen Choice Awards, Cimorelli won the award of Choice Web Star.

During the months of May and June 2014, Cimorelli performed at DigiFest in London, New York City, Toronto, and Minnesota. Later in June 2014 Cimorelli launched their original web series titled Summer with Cimorelli.

On October 27, 2014, Cimorelli released their 5th EP, Renegade. The EP consisted of 4 original songs. The EP peaked at number 10 on the US Heatseekers chart. A month later on November 24, 2014, Cimorelli released their 1st Christmas EP and 6th overall EP, Christmas Magic. The EP consisted of 5 Christmas covers.

In 2015, Cimorelli departed from Island Records and Republic Records, moved to Nashville, Tennessee, and became independent artists.

2015–present: Independent artists
Around May 2015, Cimorelli released a mixtape called Hearts on Fire, which included 9 acoustic tracks. This was their first release after departing from Island Records and Republic Records.

On May 17, 2016, Cimorelli released their debut full-length album, Up at Night. It debuted at number 24 on the US Top Country Albums chart and peaked at number 7 on the US Heatseekers chart. The album sold 1,500 copies in the first week in the US.

Later that year on December 20, Cimorelli released their 2nd full-length album, Alive. It peaked at number 11 on the US Heatseekers and at number 42 on the Top Christian Albums chart.

On October 27, 2017, Cimorelli released their 3rd album Sad Girls Club. The album features a solo song from each sister, which was a new concept for the group. Sad Girls Club peaked at number 17 on the US Heatseekers chart.

In the summer of 2018, Cimorelli released their 7th EP, I Love You, or Whatever. The EP consisted of 4 songs and 3 spoken word poems read by Katherine, Amy, and Dani. As well, Lisa, Amy, and Dani starred in the indie film Hope Springs Eternal alongside Mia Rose Frampton, Stony Blyden, Lauren Giraldo, and Pej Vahdat.

In October 2018, Cimorelli released their 8th EP, Here's to Us: Wedding Song to celebrate the marriage of Christina and her husband Nick. The EP consisted of 4 covers and 3 original songs (2 sung by Christina only and 1 sung by Cimorelli).

In November 2018, Cimorelli released their 2nd Christmas EP and 9th overall EP, Christmas Lights. The EP consisted of 2 covers and 2 original songs.

Discography
The discography of Cimorelli consists of nine extended plays, three full-length albums, one mixtape, and two Christmas compilation albums.

Studio albums

Compilation albums

Extended plays

Mixtapes

Singles

Awards and nominations

Tours
Made in America Radio Tour (2013)
DigiFest Tour (2014)
Renegade Tour (2015)
Hearts on Fire Tour (2015)
Up at Night Tour (2016)
Believe in You Tour (2019)

References

External links
 
 
 

2007 establishments in California
Musical groups established in 2007
American YouTubers
Music YouTubers
Sibling musical groups
Family musical groups
American girl groups
A cappella musical groups
Musical groups from Sacramento, California
People from El Dorado Hills, California
American people of Italian descent
American people of Irish descent
American Roman Catholics
Catholics from California